Annular ligament may refer to:

 Annular ligament of femur
 Annular ligaments of fingers
 Annular ligament of radius
Annular ligament of stapes (also known as the stapediovestibular joint)
 Annular ligaments of trachea
 Annular ligaments of toes
 Annular stapedial ligament

See also 
 Annular